William Enrique Cuevas Osorio  (born October 14, 1990) is a Venezuelan professional baseball pitcher for the Diablos Rojos del México of the Mexican League. He has played in Major League Baseball (MLB) for the Boston Red Sox and the Detroit Tigers. He also played for the KT Wiz of the KBO League.

Career

Path to the majors
Cuevas was signed by the Red Sox as an international free agent in July 2008. He spent two-and-a-half seasons with the DSL Red Sox spanning 2009–2011, before joining the GCL rookie team late in 2011. He then was promoted to the Class A Short Season Lowell Spinners in 2012, and played with them for the entire season.

Cuevas emerged during his first season with Lowell, as he posted eight wins and two losses in 77⅓ innings of work, striking out 72 batters while walking only 15 for a solid 4.80 SO/BB ratio. He also set a Spinners record for the lowest earned run average (ERA) in a regular season, as his 1.40 ERA bested the 1.50 mark set by Kyle Weiland in 2008. In addition, Cuevas ranked in the top of several statistical categories in the New York–Penn League, tying for first in wins, for second both in ERA and innings, and for third in strikeouts.

Cuevas was promoted to the Class A-Advanced Salem Red Sox in 2013 but struggled for most of the year. He posted an 8–9 record and a 5.05 ERA in 26 starts, while striking out 109 and walking 40 in 135⅓ innings. He returned to Salem in 2014, but spent two stints on the disabled list, including one that lasted roughly a month. He then went 2–6 with a 4.70 ERA in 24 appearances (10 starts), including 80 strikeouts and 32 walks in 95⅓ innings.

Cuevas gained a promotion to the Double-A Portland Sea Dogs in 2015, where he was used strictly as a starter and had a solid season, becoming one of five Sea Dogs players selected for the Eastern League All-Star team. Overall, he was 8–5 with a 3.40 ERA in 19 starts for Portland, including 91 strikeouts and 41 walks in 95⅓ innings. He then joined the Triple-A Pawtucket Red Sox in early August, and ended his season on a high note. Cuevas went 3–2 with a 2.63 ERA in seven starts for Pawtucket, striking out 37 and walking 14 in 41 innings. As a result, he completed his seventh season in the Sox farm system setting career highs in wins (11), innings pitched (136⅓) and strikeouts (128), tying for the most wins in the system while ending second in strikeouts and seventh in innings.

Boston Red Sox
Cuevas started the 2016 season with Triple-A Pawtucket. He was selected by the Red Sox and added to their 40-man roster on April 20.  He made his MLB debut the next day, pitching  innings of relief against the Tampa Bay Rays, giving up three hits and two runs while taking the loss. He made two other appearances with Boston during the season, both in June. Overall, with the 2016 Red Sox, Cuevas made three appearances with a 3.60 ERA in five innings pitched, striking out three and walking six. He also pitched 25 games (18 starts) with Pawtucket, compiling a 6–8 record with 4.19 ERA in 131 innings pitched. He became a free agent after the season.

Detroit Tigers
On November 19, 2016, Cuevas signed a minor league contract with the Detroit Tigers. The Tigers purchased Cuevas's contract on April 13, 2017, adding him to their active roster. He made his only appearance with the Tigers the next day, pitching  of an inning against the Cleveland Indians, allowing four runs on three hits. He declined an outright assignment to Triple-A on June 1, 2017, and elected free agency.

Miami Marlins (minors)
On June 7, 2017, Cuevas signed a minor league deal with the Miami Marlins. He played for the Triple-A New Orleans Baby Cakes, appearing in 15 games (11 starts) with a 2–7 record and 5.43 ERA. Cuevas elected free agency on November 6, 2017.

Second stint with Boston
In January 2018, Cuevas signed a minor league contract with the Red Sox. He was assigned to Triple-A and made 15 appearances (all starts) with Pawtucket through July 1, compiling a 5–5 record with 3.65 ERA in  innings pitched. The Red Sox selected his contract on July 2, adding him to their major league roster. Cuevas made his season debut with Boston the next day, pitching two innings against the Washington Nationals, allowing one run on two hits; he was optioned back to Triple-A the following day. Cuevas was recalled back to Boston on July 8, and without making an appearance was optioned back to Triple-A on July 10. Boston activated Cuevas on August 11, as their 26th player for a doubleheader against the Baltimore Orioles; he pitched in relief in the second game, and was returned to Triple-A the following day. Cuevas was called up to Boston on September 1, when rosters expanded. Cuevas finished the season with an 0–2 record and 7.41 ERA with Boston, while making nine appearances (one start) and striking out 20 in 17 innings. Cuevas was not included on Boston's postseason roster.

KT Wiz
On November 20, 2018, Cuevas was granted his unconditional release so he could sign with the KT Wiz of Korea's KBO League. Cuevas produced a 13–10 record with a 3.62 ERA and 135 strikeouts over 184 innings in 2019. He re-signed with KT for the 2020 season for $900,000 (and $100,000 in incentives). On December 13, 2020, Cuevas re-signed with the Wiz for the 2021 season on a one-year $750K contract with a mutual option for the 2022 season. In November 2021, Cuevas was designated as the starting pitcher for the first game of the Korean Series in franchise history. He earned the win, pitching  innings and giving up one run on seven hits, with eight strikeouts. He was named MVP of the game. On December 30, 2021, Cuevas re-signed with the Wiz for the 2022 season on a one-year contract worth up to $1.1 million. He suffered an elbow injury following his second start of the season, and was later released by the club on May 18, 2022.

Diablos Rojos del México
On July 14, 2022, Cuevas signed with the Diablos Rojos del México of the Mexican League.

See also
 List of Major League Baseball players from Venezuela

Sources

External links

Pura Pelota (Venezuelan Winter League),

1990 births
Living people
Boston Red Sox players
Detroit Tigers players
Dominican Summer League Red Sox players
Gulf Coast Red Sox players
KBO League pitchers
KT Wiz players
Leones del Caracas players
Lowell Spinners players
Major League Baseball pitchers
Major League Baseball players from Venezuela
New Orleans Baby Cakes players
Pawtucket Red Sox players
People from Turmero
Portland Sea Dogs players
Salem Red Sox players
Tiburones de La Guaira players
Toledo Mud Hens players
Venezuelan expatriate baseball players in South Korea
Venezuelan expatriate baseball players in the United States
Venezuelan people of Colombian descent
2017 World Baseball Classic players
2023 World Baseball Classic players
Venezuelan expatriate baseball players in the Dominican Republic
Venezuelan expatriate baseball players in Mexico
Diablos Rojos del México players